Johann Georg Schürer (1720 – 16 February 1786) was a German baroque composer.  He was born in Bohemia, and died in Dresden, aged about 65.

Operas
 Astrea placata ovvero La felicità della terra, (libretto Biaggio Campagnari), 7 October 1746 Warsaw; 29. Oct. 1746 Dresden, Mingottisches Theater
 La Galathea (libretto Pietro Metastasio), dramma per musica 2 Acts 8. Nov. 1746 Dresden, Mingottisches Theater
 Doris, ein musikalisches Schäferspiel in 2 parts 13. Feb. 1747 Dresden, Mingottisches Theater
 L'Ercole sul Termodonte (libretto Giacomo Francesco Bussani), dramma per musica 3 acts 19. July 1747 Dresden, Mingottisches Theater
 Calandro (libretto Stefano Benedetto Pallavicino), comedia per musica 3 acts (20. Jan. 1748 Dresden, Mingottisches Theater

External links
 

German Baroque composers
1720 births
1786 deaths
18th-century German composers
18th-century male musicians